Big Brother is a 2020 Indian Malayalam-language action thriller film written, directed, and co-produced by Siddique. It was jointly produced by S Talkies, Shaman International, and Vaishaka Cinema, in association with Carnival Movie Network. The film stars Mohanlal in the title role, along with Arbaaz Khan, Vishnu Unnikrishnan, Sarjano Khalid, Anoop Menon, Honey Rose, Mirnaa Menon, Chetan Hansraj, Gaadha, Siddique, and Tini Tom in supporting cast. Big Brother marks Arbaaz Khan's debut appearance in Malayalam cinema. The songs and background score for the film was composed by Deepak Dev.

The film began principal photography in July 2019 and was completed in December. It was shot extensively in Bangalore, and the remaining in Mysore, Mangalore, Ernakulam, and Coimbatore. Big Brother was released worldwide on 16 January 2020 and received mixed reviews from critics, where the film was unsuccessful at box office.

Plot
Sachidanandan is released from prison, where he receives a letter from his brother, who tells that a surprise awaits him. While travelling, Sachi remembers his past. Sachi's father was about to remarry and Sachi was excited about getting a new mother. He noticed that the mother had a son which was going to be his step-brother named Vishnu. He tries to befriend Vishnu, but he rejects him but later on starts accepting him. His step-mother is also going to have a new baby. Once after returning from a function Sachi, witnesses his step-mother being harassed by her ex-husband and tries to take away Vishnu. 

Sachi kills the man while saving his brother and mother. He goes to a juvenile home for his crime, where he befriends Khan, Ghani and Pareekkar. One day, Sachi witnesses Khan and Ghani getting beaten up by a ruthless cop,  Sachi kills the officer while trying to save his friends and hence goes to a central prison as he is an adult. He is sentenced for two life term sentences. In the prison, he discovers his night vision. As Sachi exits the prison, he is well-received by his younger brother Manu, who was born after he went to prison. He was also received by his prison friends Pareekkar, Khan and Ghani. They invite Sachi to join them to work with Edwin Moses, who is a mysterious drug lord.

Sachi warns them and decides to lead a peaceful life with his family. The surprise awaiting him was that his brother Dr. Vishnu is soon to marry his colleague Vandhana and that the marriage was postponed so that Sachi can witness the marriage as Vishnu was adamant. The marriage takes place, and as Vandhana seeks Sachi's blessings, she realizes that he was the one who saved her from a gang and in the process of saving her, Sachi's back was scratched by a aruva. The next day, Vandhana forces Sachi to tell the truth about him. When the cops learnt that Sachi could see in the dark, he and many other prisoners were sent for commando operations.

They were often sent unarmed to face armed opponents. Sachi's prison term was extended as every time he went for the operation, the report written was that he used to escape from prison. Many prisoners never returned. Their bodies were found in random places. A police officer named Vedanandham IPS approaches Sachi, and explains that the drug syndicate has returned stronger as ever, and it is controlled by a person named Edwin Moses, whose identity is unknown to anyone. Vedanandham tells Sachi that innocent people are used for the drug business without their knowledge. Sachi rejects it, saying that he wants to live peacefully with his family. 

Sachi and his family faces many troubles from Edwin Moses and his partner Shetty. Later, Shetty explains to Sachi that Edwin is doing all this for a drug container worth crores which is in Shetty's control. Sachi finds his friends is in alliance with Edwin Moses, but reveals that they had nothing to do with it unless a gangster named Muthan died. Edwin had been pestering them for the container. It was revealed that Sachi had the container. He had stolen it from Muthan earlier. Edwin's men attack Sachi and his friends. Sachi and his friends defeat them. Vedantham arrives there and kills Edwin's men, Khan and Pareekkar, while Ghani survives. 

Enraged, Sachi beats Vedhantham after which he calls Edwin Moses from Pareekkar's phone, where it is revealed that Edwin Moses was none other than Vedantham. Enraged, Sachi destroys the container in front of Vedhantham and kills him. After this, Sachi repairs the old car as he reunites with his family.

Cast

Production

Development
In May 2018, Siddique revealed in an interview to The New Indian Express that his next Malayalam film is with Mohanlal and it will be released in April 2019. Later, media outlets reported that the film has been titled Big Brother.

Casting
More cast were revealed in May 2019, including Arbaaz Khan, Anoop Menon, Vishnu Unnikrishnan, Sarjano Khalid, Chemban Vinod Jose, Siddique, Janardanan, and Tini Tom in pivotal roles. Big Brother marks the Malayalam film debut of Bollywood actor Khan. He plays Vedandam IPS, an encounter specialist. Mohanlal plays Sachithanandan, and Menon and Khalid portrays his younger brothers. Menon plays doctor Vishnu, according to him, Vishnu is the "nicest character" he has played so far. Regina Cassandra and Satna Titus were in talks to play the female lead roles that month. The former for the role of Arya Shetty, the daughter of a wealthy businessman and Sachithanandan's romantic interest, and the latter as the pair of Khalid's character. Titus was confirmed in that month along with another debutante Shilpa Ajayan as the pair of Menon's character. Cassandra opted out from the film due to scheduling conflicts. She was replaced by newcomer Mirnaa Menon, whose casting took place only few days before filming. Gaadha plays one of the three female lead roles in the film, it is her first Malayalam appearance and second film after Nimir.

Filming
Principal photography began on 11 July 2019 in Ernakulam. Filming was initially scheduled to begin on 20 June 2019 with Mohanlal joining on 1 July after finishing his work in Ittymaani: Made in China. The film was mostly shot at Bangalore with a few scenes at Kochi. Mohanlal was filming scenes in Kochi in September. In October, filming took place near the HMT factory in Bangalore. The team were also shooting in Mysore in that month. Lalitha Mahal palace was a filming location. The film was to be shot at the streets of Mysore but heavy downpour caused delay and filming was restricted to indoor sequences. Final schedule of filming resumed in mid-November. Final schedule took place in places such as Ernakulam and Coimbatore. Mirnaa had 100 days shoot. Filming was completed in December 2019, taking longer than expected. The budget also hiked to ₹32 crore. The stunts were choreographed by Supreme Sundar and Stunt Silva, and the songs were choreographed by Brinda, Dinesh Kumar, and Prasanna Sujit.

Music

The film features a background score and three original songs composed by Deepak Dev, with lyrics by Rafeeq Ahamed and Santhosh Varma. The audio launch function of the film was held at Darbar Hall Ground, Ernakulam on 26 December 2019. The soundtrack album was released by the label Millennium Audios on 21 December 2019.

Release

Theatrical
Big Brother was released worldwide on 16 January 2020 opened to mixed reviews from critics.

Home media
The satellite and digital rights of the  film were sold to Surya TV and Amazon Prime Video. The film is also dubbed in Hindi and released on YouTube in May 2021, which received more than 15 million views in nine days.

Satellite rights & Dubbed versions 
 Satellite rights of this film acquired by Surya TV for a good price 
 
 The Hindi dubbed version was premiered on Colors Cineplex and later streamed on YouTube
 
 It was dubbed into Tamil,Telugu and Kannada along with Original version on Amazon Prime Video.

References

External links 
 
 

2020s Malayalam-language films
Films about brothers
Indian action thriller films
Films directed by Siddique
Films shot in Bangalore
Films shot in Mysore
Films shot in Coimbatore
Films shot in Kochi
Films scored by Deepak Dev
Fictional portrayals of the Karnataka Police
Indian films about revenge
2020 action thriller films